Gambeeram is a 2004 Indian Tamil-language action film directed by Suresh, starring Sarath Kumar and Laila.

Cast

Soundtrack 
Soundtrack was composed by Mani Sharma and lyrics were written by Pa. Vijay and Kabilan.

Reception 
The film received mixed to positive reviews from critics

Indiaglitz wrote, "Sarath seems to have worked well in terms of shaping his physique for the role. Some of his utterances at politicians seem pre-conceived. Laila plays a police constable. She takes care of Sarath Kumar's daughter and appears in a couple of songs. Vadivelu evokes laughter at places. Thanikala Bharani, a Tollywood comedian is introduced       as villain in the movie.  Kanal Kannan's stunts, Y N Murali's cinematography and V T Vijayan's editing add strength to the film.".

Sify wrote, "It is an out and out Sarath Kumar film as he dominates the film till the end. In action scenes he flexes his muscles and fights with a new villain Jasper (who is 165 kg!), and looks awesome. Laila has nothing much to do other than speak in her shrieky dubbed voice and sing duets with the hero. New girl Pranathi is promising, while Vadivelu's comedy does an interesting sideshow as a dumb cop. Suresh tries to make a racy cop story, which lacks a strong screenplay. The music of Mani Sharma is nothing great.".

Balaji Balasubramaniam of Thirapadam.com wrote, "The khaki dress sits nicely on Sarathkumar and he looks every bit the honest and tough police officer. Laila plays her trademark role and her natural facial expressions and mannerisms aid her well. Pranathi makes up for what she lacks in glamour with a natural, charming performance. Thanikabharani plays the heartless politician well enough but doesn't bring anything special to the role. Vadivelu has a sporadically funny comedy track where he gradually moves down the rungs in the police administration.".

Malathi Rangarajan of The Hindu wrote, ""Gambeeram" offers a solid role for Sarathkumar. With commendable underplay and agile action Sarath does justice to the job on hand. Laila's scared, vulnerable look suits her to perfection. And debutant Pranathi's sparkling eyes help her make an impression as Sarath's wife Saroja. This is another comedy track in which Vadivelu evokes some healthy laughter. The new `villain' Thanikala Bharani and that hulk of a fighter (Jasper) are just stereotypes. Manisharma's re-recording has never believed in mellowed sound. True to its name, "Gambeeram" looks majestic, dignified and commanding in every frame.".

References 

2004 films
Fictional portrayals of the Tamil Nadu Police
2000s Tamil-language films
Films scored by Mani Sharma
Indian action films